Apostolos Nikolaidis (19 April 1896 – 15 October 1980) was a Greek athlete, football manager and businessman. He was a leading board member and president of Panathinaikos A.C.

Life and career 

He was born in Plovdiv, Bulgaria, a member of the Greek community. After his graduation from the Robert College in Istanbul, he moved first to Thessaloniki (where he competed as an athlete of Aris Thessaloniki) and later to Athens in 1917 and joined the family of Panathinaikos. He was an athletic phenomenon, as he successfully competed in decathlon, football, basketball and volleyball and also a successful racing driver. He was member of the Greek team of 1920 (in Antwerp), both as a football player and as a track athlete. He played football for more than ten years and contributed to all sports departments of PAO. He became also manager of the Greece national football team.

In 1926–27 he was elected president of the Hellenic Football Federation and for a period of more than twenty years president of the Hellenic Amateur Athletic Association (1945–67). Moreover, he was president of the Automobile and Touring Club of Greece. For many decades, he was a board member of Panathinaikos A.C. and in 1974 he became president of the club. His contribution was significant to the transformation of Panathinaikos to a successful multi-sports club, apart from football.

From 1974 to 1976 he was also president of the Hellenic Olympic Committee. He was also a businessman and owner of Softex.

Upon his death, as an honour, his coffin was carried on the shoulders of eight athletes from different PAO departments: Ikonomopoulos, Kamaras, Antoniadis (football), Zacharopoulos (track), Georgantis, Iliopoulos (volleyball), Garos, Kalogeropoulos (basketball). The home stadium of Panathinaikos at Alexandras Avenue was named after him in 1981, at a ceremony presided by the then Prime Minister Georgios Rallis.

References

1896 births
1980 deaths
Athletes (track and field) at the 1920 Summer Olympics
Footballers at the 1920 Summer Olympics
Robert College alumni
Greek decathletes
Greek footballers
Greek men's basketball players
Greek Basket League players
Greek men's volleyball players
Bulgarian expatriates in the Ottoman Empire
Bulgarian emigrants to Greece
Olympic athletes of Greece
Olympic footballers of Greece
Association football midfielders
Fenerbahçe S.K. footballers
Panathinaikos F.C. players
Sportspeople from Plovdiv
Panathinaikos A.O.
Panathinaikos F.C. presidents
Panathinaikos F.C. managers
Panathinaikos F.C. non-playing staff
Panathinaikos Athletics
Greek male athletes
Bulgarian people of Greek descent
Olympic decathletes
Greek football managers
Greece national football team managers
Constantinopolitan Greeks
Footballers from Istanbul
Basketball players from Istanbul
Volleyball players from Istanbul
Sportspeople from Istanbul
Businesspeople from Istanbul